Gerenia, or Gerena (τὰ Γέρηνα), or Gerenus or Gerenos (Γέρηνος), was a town of ancient Messenia, where, according to Greek mythology, Nestor was said to have been brought up after the destruction of Pylos, and whence he derived the surname Gerenian, which occurs so frequently in the Iliad of Homer. There is, however, no town of this name mentioned in Homer, and many of the ancient critics identified the later Gerenia with the Homeric Enope. 

Under the Roman Empire, Gerenia was the most northerly of the Eleuthero-Laconian towns, and was situated on the eastern side of the Messenian Gulf, upon a mountainous promontory. Pausanias says that in the district of Gerenia there was a mountain called Calathium, upon which there was a sanctuary of Claea (an Oread), and close to the latter a cavern, of which the entrance was narrow, though within there were many things worthy to be seen. 

Its site is located near the Zarnata, аbove the modern village Kampos. Two very ancient inscriptions discovered at Gerenia are published by August Böckh.

References

Populated places in ancient Messenia
Populated places in ancient Laconia
Former populated places in Greece
Ancient Greek archaeological sites in Greece